Heralding – The Fireblade is the fourth studio album by the German Viking metal band Falkenbach. This record is made up of songs originally intended to be the band's first album, Fireblade, which was shelved in 1995. For the 15-year anniversary of the band, the tracks were finally re-recorded (using the same session musicians as on Ok nefna tysvar Ty) and released. The LP version, limited to 1,000 copies, was released in 2006 by No Colours Records with the first 300 in transparent clear vinyl.

Track listing

 The song "Heralder" is a re-recorded shorter version of "The Heralder", an old track, which once was only available as a bonus track for the picture LP version of ...En their medh ríki fara....
 The song "Læknishendr" is also a re-recording and can be found on the Læknishendr and the Promo 1995 demo albums in two different early/demo forms. Another version of the song was used on the band's first album ...En their medh ríki fara....

Personnel
 Vratyas Vakyas - vocals, guitars, keyboards

Additional personnel
 Hagolaz - guitars, bass guitar
 Tyrann - screaming vocals, spoken parts
 Boltthorn - drums, percussion
 Christophe Szpajdel - logo
 Patrick Damiani - recording, mixing, mastering
 Robin Schmidt - mastering
 Philip Breuer - layout

Notes

2005 albums
Falkenbach albums
Napalm Records albums